Hermenegildo Martínez (born 13 August 1937) is a Spanish gymnast. He competed in six events at the 1960 Summer Olympics.

References

1937 births
Living people
Spanish male artistic gymnasts
Olympic gymnasts of Spain
Gymnasts at the 1960 Summer Olympics
Sportspeople from Melilla